Tomás Martín Etcheverry was the defending champion but lost in the final to Jaume Munar.

Munar won the title after defeating Etcheverry 6–3, 4–6, 6–1 in the final.

Seeds

Draw

Finals

Top half

Bottom half

References

External links
Main draw
Qualifying draw

Internazionali di Tennis Città di Perugia - 1
2022 Singles